Solar power in Ukraine is obtained from photovoltaics or solar thermal energy. 

The government announced in the law on green auctions, adopted in April 2019, that the feed in tariffs would be replaced by an auction based quota system coming in force in 2020 for all solar PV systems greater than 1 MW, which if applied effectively could facilitate a larger and  sustainable solar development in the country. Households in 2020 will still be able to obtain a green FIT tariff for systems up to 50 kW in size which can be either rooftop or ground mounted solar systems.

During the 2022 Russian invasion of Ukraine, the Russian invaders destroyed a solar energy plant in Merefa, close to Kharkiv, and they also stole the Tokmak solar energy plant in the Zaporizhia region.

History 
It was stopped in 1990s and demolished afterwards.

In 2011, 90% of electricity came from nuclear and coal. In order to reduce this, Ukraine adopted a feed-in tariff (FIT) which was one of the highest in the world - UAH 5.0509 (EUR 0.46) per kWh. Europe's largest solar park at the time, the 100 MW Perovo Solar Park (Now, Nikopol solor park, Ukraine) was completed at the end of 2011. Installations in Ukraine began to boom in 2018 but there remained a doubt that the expansion would be sustainable and the costs and benefits of the rapid development would be spread unequally.

2019 DTEK inaugurated 240 MW solar plant in Ukraine.

Installed capacity
The latest information about installed solar energy capacity in Ukraine, is kept up to date by the national power company UKRENERGO.

407,9 MW SPP - is in the occupied territory of the Crimea

Residential solar power 
Households in Ukraine tend on average to have larger solar PV systems than in other countries. The feed in tariff is available for larger systems and from 2020 may be up to 50 kW and can be both rooftop or ground mounted. In March 2019 the power of residential solar was an average of 21.5 kW per family. In western Europe residential solar is typically 3-5 kW per household.

As of March 31, 2019 there were 8,850 households with rooftop solar in Ukraine, with a total capacity of 190 MW. Investments in these power plants amounted to about 180 million euros. The largest number of rooftop solar units were installed in the Dnipropetrovsk region at 1072 units. In the Kyiv region - 904 units, in Ternopil region - 808 units, in Ivano-Frankivsk region - 580 units, and in Kirovohrad region- 562 units.

In Q2, solar panels were installed on over 3,000 additional households with a total added capacity of more than 85 MW, which was more than double the first quarter of 2019.

By Q3 2019 the total installed capacity of  installed solar in households was 280 MW, a 100 fold increase on 2015 levels, and the investment of households in solar energy amounted to EUR 240 million. The largest residential solar systems in 2019 were installed in households in Dnipropetrovsk, Ternopil and Kyiv regions (including Kyiv). These three regions account for more than a third of all households using solar energy.

Large scale solar power parks

Changes to Energy Markets 
In 2019, changes were announced to the Ukrainian energy market operations that have significant impacts on the growth and operation of large scale solar facilities in Ukraine.  These include a new generous feed-in-tariff scheme and the requirement for solar energy facilities to provide their own energy generation forecasts.

Gallery

See also 
 Growth of photovoltaics
 List of photovoltaic power stations
 Biofuel in Ukraine
 Geothermal power in Ukraine
 Hydroelectricity in Ukraine
 Wind power in Ukraine
 Renewable energy in Ukraine
  - 246 MW

Notes

References